Magli is an Italian surname. Notable people with the surname include:

 Antonio Magli (born 1991), Italian footballer
 Augusto Magli (1923–1998), Italian footballer
 Giovanni Gualberto Magli, Italian castrato
 Giulio Magli (born 1964), Italian Astrophysicist/Archaeoastronomer

Other
 Bruno Magli, Italian luxury brand
 Magli Dériza, pseudonyme of the  French opera singer Marguerite Bériza

Italian-language surnames